Inda is the first installment in a quartet of books which act as an historical prequel to Sherwood Smith's other books set in Sartorias-deles, the world which she has been "writing about since [she] was eight years old,". Inda'''s story takes place in the southern hemisphere of this planet.Indas sequel, The Fox, came out on August 7, 2007.

Overview
Indevan-Dal "Inda" Algara-Vayir is the younger son of a Marlovan prince. He is sent to the Academy to learn the art of war, the highest art of his warrior country.

Once at the Academy, life is not as Inda expected. Through determination and unexpected friendships, Inda survives until a fateful summer when one of his classmates dies and his life is changed forever. Now exiled to the sea, serving aboard a merchant sailor Indevan-Dal's life is no more and Inda's begins

CharactersIndevan "Inda" Algara-Vayir: The second son of the Marlovan prince and princess, Jarend Algara-Vayir and Fareas Fera-Vayir. He is Tanrid's future Shield Arm.Tanrid Algara-Vayir: The heir to the Marlovan prince and is Inda's older brother.Hadand Algara-Vayir: Inda and Tanrid's sister. She is betrothed to the Marlovan king's heir, Aldren Montrei-Vayir.Evred "Sponge" Montrei-Vayir: The second son to the Marlovan king, Tlennen Montrei-Vayir and his queen, Wisthia Shagal. Went to the Academy with Inda. He is Aldren's future Shield Arm.Aldren Montre-Vayir: Evred's brother and heir to the Marlovan throne.Barend Montre-Vayir: Cousin to Evred and Aldren, the son of Anderle Montrei-Vayir, the king's brother and Shield Arm. He is sent to sea and presumed dead when his ships are destroyed.Kendred "Dogpiss" Noth: He went to the Academy with Inda. His death was blamed on Inda.Landred "Cherry-Stripe" Marlo-Vayir: He went to the Academy with Inda and is the future Shield Arm to his brother, Aldren "Buck" Marlo-VayirCamarend "Cama" Tya-Vayir: Went to the Academy with Inda and the future Shield Arm of Stalgrid "Horsebutt" Tya-VayirJoret Dei: Tanrid's betrothedTdor Marth-Davan''' - Inda's betrothed

Trivia
Smith intended to release the trilogy as a pair, in order to save prospective readers time and money, but found it unworkable to do so. This is why the book ends somewhat abruptly.

Footnotes

External links
 Sartorias-deles Wiki
 Author Sherwood Smith's Homepage

2006 American novels
2006 fantasy novels
American fantasy novels
DAW Books books
Novels by Sherwood Smith